Mont Gond is a mountain of the Pennine Alps, overlooking Siviez, south of Nendaz in the canton of Valais.

References

External links
 Mont Gond on Hikr

Mountains of the Alps
Mountains of Switzerland
Mountains of Valais
Two-thousanders of Switzerland